James C. Carpenter was a Lancaster County, Pennsylvania covered bridge builder. He is known to have built nine covered bridges, five of which still exist. Two of his bridges, Herr's Mill Covered Bridge and Colemanville Covered Bridge, are among the longest covered bridges remaining in the county. Only Elias McMellen is known to have built more covered bridges in the county, including a rebuild of Kauffman's Distillery Covered Bridge and Leaman's Place Covered Bridge, both originally built by James C. Carpenter.

Leaman's Place Covered Bridge (built in 1845)
Colemanville Covered Bridge (built in 1856)
Kauffman's Distillery Covered Bridge (built in 1857)
Herr's Mill Covered Bridge (rebuilt in 1875)
Neff's Mill Covered Bridge (rebuilt in 1875)
Siegrist's Mill Covered Bridge (built in 1885, destroyed in 2011)

References 

American bridge engineers
19th-century American engineers
People from Lancaster County, Pennsylvania
Year of death missing
Year of birth missing